Hollister Municipal Airport  is a city-owned public-use airport located three nautical miles (6 km) north of the central business district of Hollister, a city in San Benito County, California, United States.

Although most U.S. airports use the same three-letter location identifier for the FAA and IATA, Hollister Municipal Airport is assigned CVH by the FAA and HLI by the IATA.

Facilities and operations 

For the 12-month period ending January 23, 2007, the airport had 73,000 aircraft operations, an average of 200 per day: 98% general aviation and 2% military. There are 205 aircraft based at this airport: 56% single engine, 8% multi-engine, 4% helicopters, 10% ultralight and 22% gliders.

CAL FIRE's Hollister Air Attack Base is located at the airport, providing rapid response to wildfires in San Benito County and surrounding Santa Clara, Santa Cruz and Monterey Counties.

Gliders 
Hollister Airport is a regional center for glider activity.  Gliders moved to Hollister after the Hummingbird Haven gliderport in Livermore and the Sky Sailing gliderport in Fremont were both closed in 1989.  Glider rides, lessons and a non-profit club are located at the airport.

A record for glider flight distance from Hollister was set on June 21, 2008, by Eric Rupp with a flight to Calexico on the Mexican border, 444 miles away.

References

External links 
 City of Hollister - Airport page

Gliderports in the United States
Airports in San Benito County, California